Neferhetepes (nefer-hetep-es; nfr-ḥtp-s, "Her Peace/Grace Is Beautiful") was an ancient Egyptian princess of the 4th Dynasty; a daughter of Pharaoh Djedefre who ruled between his father Khufu and his brother Khafre. Her mother was Hetepheres II.

Biography 
The name of Neferhetepes is known to us from a statue fragment found in Abu Rawash where her father had a pyramid complex built. She had the titles King's Daughter of His Body and God's Wife.

Neferhetepes was also a Priestess of Hathor, mistress of the sycamore (hemet-netjer-hut-hor nebet-nehet, ḥmt-nṯr-ḥwt-ḥr nb.t-nht). She is the earliest attested priestess of Hathor. The title appears on the base of a statue from Abu Rawash.

Neferhetepes has been proposed as the mother of pharaoh Shepseskaf by Ariel Kozloff, although for Vivienne Gae Callender there is no evidence in support of this hypothesis.

Until recently, Egyptologists thought it as possible that Neferhetepes was identical to a woman of the same name who was buried in a small pyramid next to the pyramid of Userkaf, the first king of the 5th Dynasty. In a document mentioning her funerary cult, Neferhetepes is mentioned as having the title King's Mother but she didn't bear the title of King's Wife. Since her chapel was modified under the reign of Sahure, second king of the Fifth Dynasty (whose name was found on a fragment in the chapel), it is likely that she was the mother of either Userkaf or Sahure; the other king is the son of Khentkaus I. However, most recently, reliefs were found near the causeway of king Sahure's pyramid. They show that there was a second woman with the name Neferhetepes, wife of Userkaf and mother of Sahure. She lived into the reign of the latter and is therefore most likely not identical with the princess, but is identical to the woman buried in the pyramid next to that of Userkaf.

See also 
 Neferhetepes, wife of Userkaf

Sources

 

26th-century BC women
26th-century BC clergy
26th-century BC Egyptian people
Princesses of the Fourth Dynasty of Egypt
Ancient Egyptian priestesses
Djedefre
Hathor